The Waddells Mill Pond Site is an archaeological site located seven miles northwest of Marianna, Florida. On December 15, 1972, it was added to the U.S. National Register of Historic Places.

This was the site of an important late prehistoric mound and village complex. Archaeological excavations at the site during the 1960s and 1970s revealed two mounds and the remains of a circular fortification. The site is believed to have been abandoned prior to the arrival of the Spanish in the region in 1674.

See also
 Fort Walton Culture
 Mississippian culture

References

External links
 Jackson County listings at National Register of Historic Places
 Jackson County listings at Florida's Office of Cultural and Historical Programs

South Appalachian Mississippian culture
Pre-historic cities in the United States
Archaeological sites on the National Register of Historic Places in Florida
Geography of Jackson County, Florida
Mounds in Florida
National Register of Historic Places in Jackson County, Florida